Beggarman, Thief is a 1977 novel written by Irwin Shaw. It was a sequel to his 1970 bestseller Rich Man, Poor Man and focuses on the surviving Jordache siblings, Gretchen and Rudolph; their deceased brother Thomas' teenage son Wesley Jordache; and Gretchen's adult son Billy Abbott.

The miniseries adapted from the original novel had a 1976-77 sequel entitled Rich Man, Poor Man Book II, broadcast prior to the publication of Beggarman, Thief and was not based on the second novel. A television adaptation of Beggarman, Thief followed in 1979, starring Jean Simmons (as Gretchen), Andrew Stevens (as Billy), Glenn Ford, Lynn Redgrave, Bo Hopkins, Tovah Feldshuh, Susan Strasberg, Tom Nolan (as Wesley), Jean-Pierre Aumont, Alex Cord, Anne Francis and Joyce Brothers.

External links

1977 American novels
Novels by Irwin Shaw
Sequel novels